Ananda Balika Vidyalaya (Sinhala: ආනන්ද බාලිකා විද්‍යාලය) is a public girls school located in Kotte., Sri Lanka. It was established in 1971 as the girls school of Ananda Sastralaya, Kotte.

History 
In the 1960s, Stanley Thilakaratne, a former MP from Kotte (who was selected as the speaker of the parliament later) pointed out the need for a girls' college in Kotte and reserved an unused land plot in the 13 acre land in the Pagoda Ananda Sastralaya Junior School No. 2. New Girls' School was established on 11 January 1971 as "Ananda Balika Vidyalaya, Kotte."

Principals

References

Girls' schools in Sri Lanka
Schools in Sri Jayawardenepura Kotte